Vueling S.A. is a Spanish low-cost airline based at Viladecans in Greater Barcelona with hubs at Barcelona–El Prat Airport (main), Paris-Orly Airport in Paris, France and Leonardo da Vinci–Fiumicino Airport in Rome, Italy (secondary). It is the largest airline in Spain, measured by fleet size and number of destinations. As of 2021, Vueling serves 122 destinations in Africa, Asia, Europe and the Middle East, and carried more than 34 million passengers in 2019. Since 2013, it has been an operating company of International Airlines Group, the parent company of British Airways and Iberia.

History

Early years
Vueling was established on 10 February 2004 and commenced operations on 1 July 2004 with a flight between Barcelona and Ibiza. The initial fleet consisted of two Airbus A320 aircraft, based in Barcelona serving Brussels, Ibiza, Palma de Mallorca and Paris-CDG. The name Vueling was formed by combining the Spanish word vuelo (flight) with the English gerund suffix -ing.

Initially, major shareholders of Vueling were Apax Partners (40%), Inversiones Hemisferio (Grupo Planeta) (30%), Vueling's management team (23%) and V.A. Investor (JetBlue Airways) (7%). During its nascent stages, the company's general manager was Lázaro Ros, while Carlos Muñoz was CEO. In November 2007, Vueling appointed managing director of Spanair Lars Nygaard as CEO to replace Carlos Muñoz, who remained a member of the Board of Directors.

Madrid was added as the airline's second base in 2005, followed by its first base outside Spain at Paris CDG in 2007. Seville followed in December 2009.

Financial concerns and management re-shuffle
In 2007 Apax Partners sold its then-21% stake in the carrier in June of that year, followed by two profit warnings issued in August and October. Two company directors and the chairman resigned shortly before the second profit warning, citing differences over commercial strategy. Shares in the company were also temporarily suspended. This led to Barbara Cassani, former Chief Executive of UK low-cost airline Go, joining Vueling as chairman of the board in September 2007. The airline then embarked on a restructuring exercise and posted its first profit in mid-2009.

Vueling and Clickair merger
In June 2008, Vueling and rival Spanish low-cost airline Clickair announced their intention to merge. The merger was designed to create a carrier better able to compete in the competitive Spanish airline market and mitigate high fuel costs with Iberia as the main industrial partner. While the new company would trade under the Vueling name, Clickair's Alex Cruz was named as chief executive. The deal was subject to scrutiny and approval by European competition regulators, who were concerned that the merged airline would have a significant competitive advantage on around 19 routes. The regulators demanded the release of slots at Barcelona and other European airports as a condition of the merger. On 15 July 2009 the merger of Vueling and Clickair was completed. The new merged airline operates under the Vueling brand, with Clickair flights and aircraft re-branded under the Vueling name. It became the second largest Spanish carrier flying 8.2 million passengers in 2009, to almost 50 destinations.

Co-operation with MTV

In 2009, Vueling for the second year running co-operated with MTV during the summer season. Two of Vueling's A320 aircraft (EC-KDG and EC-KDH) were re-painted into MTV liveries with some MTV styling on-board too. The designs of both liveries were created by Custo Dalmau and both liveries were removed at the end of 2009. In the summer season of 2010, EC-KDG had again been re-painted into an MTV livery, and in 2011 it was re-painted into a livery based on the DJ and producer David Guetta; the livery has since been removed and co-operation with MTV has since ended.

2010 onwards
In November 2010, Vueling announced a new base at Toulouse Airport in France from April 2011, followed in December 2010 by the announcement of a new base in Amsterdam, also to open during April 2011. The Toulouse base opened on 23 April 2011, but has since closed.

In January 2011, further expansion was announced with Vueling adding a further nine aircraft to its fleet, including Airbus A319 aircraft. Six Airbus A320s were delivered between April and June 2011, whilst the remaining two A320s were delivered by the end of 2011.

On 21 March 2012, it was announced by CEO Alex Cruz that Rome would be added as a new base. The base launched on 25 March 2012 with one aircraft based there: the airline has since expanded at Rome with numerous new destinations. On 5 December 2012, Vueling announced the opening of a new base of operations in Florence: the carrier is to base one aircraft there and serve four new European destinations.  Ten months later, on 25 October 2013, Vueling launched Florence-Catania, its first domestic route in Italy.

Since November 2013, the airline has continued to expand from its hub at Barcelona. On 6 November 2013, Vueling announced a new base with one aircraft in Brussels, with seven new destinations from May 2014, in addition to the four previous routes from Brussels. Also in November 2013, Vueling announced an expansion of its base at Rome-Fiumicino. From mid-2014, 8 aircraft would be based there, operating more than 30 routes. This expansion meant Rome-Fiumicino would become Vueling's secondary hub, after Barcelona.

During the first weekend of July 2016, Vueling had many delays and cancellations, which resulted in an investigation by the Spanish authorities. During the same month, Vueling cancelled all its flights to Sheremetyevo International Airport, Vilnius Airport and Rabat–Salé Airport. Clients were able to get a refund or fly to the nearest airport where Vueling flew. In October 2016, Vueling shut down their bases in Brussels, Catania and Palermo as part of restructuring measures.

In March 2017, Vueling cancelled its route from Barcelona to Frankfurt Airport.

On 29 December 2017, it was announced that IAG would acquire Austrian airline Niki as a subsidiary for Vueling. However, Niki was later acquired by Niki Lauda, the owner of Laudamotion, with investment from Ryanair. A few months after losing the bid for Niki, IAG instead established Anisec Luftfahrt as a subsidiary of Vueling, operating as LEVEL, using four former Niki aircraft that had not been purchased by rival Lufthansa (and leased to Lauda).

In 2020, Vueling announced new routes linking Paris, France and Dubrovnik, Croatia and Seville, Spain and Marrakech, Morocco.

Corporate affairs

Business trends
The key trends for Vueling over recent years are shown below (as at year ending 31 December):

Takeover by IAG

In November 2012, International Airlines Group, whose subsidiary Iberia held a 45.85% stake in Vueling, offered to buy the remaining 54.15% of the company with both Iberia and IAG owning both shares and not resulting in the company being wholly owned by IAG through 100% of shares. IAG, also the owner of British Airways, plans to use Vueling to help stem losses at Iberia. However, market trends (increased profits and improved figures from Vueling resulting in a higher share-price) had made IAG's offer a significant undervaluation of the airline. Vueling had urged its shareholders to reject IAG's offer and its shareholders had until the 8th of April 2013 to decide upon the recommendation.

On 27 March 2013, IAG improved its offer for Vueling, raising its offer per share from €7 to €9.25. Vueling shares quickly surged following the announcement, rising by 8.8% to €9.23 following a temporary suspension as BMAD waited on an official comment from Vueling regarding the updated offer. The acceptance period was also increased by 48 calendar days.

On 9 April 2013, the board of Vueling unanimously recommended shareholders accept an improved offer of €9.25 per share from IAG. IAG CEO Willie Walsh confirmed that the board had recommended the new offer; however, Walsh also stated that Vueling would not be merged with Iberia, saying, "Vueling will operate as a stand-alone entity in IAG group."

On 23 April 2013, IAG acquired control of Vueling, which saw the recently purchased 44.66% stake by IAG merged with Iberia's existing 45.85% stake to form a 90.51% shareholding. Vueling remains a standalone company now within the IAG, and its management structure is unchanged; however, Vueling's CEO reports directly to IAG CEO Willie Walsh.

Frequent flyer programme
Vueling's frequent flyer programme is Vueling Club, which allows members to earn and redeem Avios for award flights or fare discounts on Vueling and IAG airlines Aer Lingus, British Airways, Iberia, and Level, and for award travel on Oneworld airline alliance partners. Vueling Club replaced Vueling's original programme, Punto (Spanish for point), on 27 October 2017, after being announced prior in August 2017. Punto allowed account holders to earn and redeem points for Vueling flights.

Destinations

Codeshare agreements
Vueling has codeshare agreements with the following airlines:

 Aer Lingus
 British Airways
 Iberia
 Level
 LATAM Brasil
 Qatar Airways

Fleet

, the Vueling fleet consists of the following aircraft:

References

External links 

 

Airlines of Spain
Low-cost carriers
Companies based in Catalonia
European Low Fares Airline Association
Spanish brands
Airlines established in 2004
International Airlines Group
Apax Partners companies
Spanish companies established in 2004
El Prat de Llobregat